Nucleus accumbens-associated protein 1 is a protein that in humans is encoded by the NACC1 gene.

References
l

External links
 
 PDBe-KB provides an overview of all the structure information available in the PDB for Human Nucleus accumbens-associated protein 1 (BTBD14B)

Further reading